Sharry Flett is a Canadian actress. She is most noted for her performances in the television films War Brides, for which she was a Bijou Award nominee for Best Actress in a Non-Feature in 1981, and The Suicide Murders, for which she was a Gemini Award nominee for Best Supporting Actress in a Drama Program or Series at the 1st Gemini Awards in 1986.

Flett trained as an opera singer, but began performing in speaking theatrical roles after finding herself being typecast in soubrette roles due to the quality of her singing voice.

Filmography

Film

Television

References

External links

Living people
Year of birth missing (living people)
20th-century Canadian actresses
21st-century Canadian actresses
Canadian film actresses
Canadian television actresses